Szeto Kam-Yuen (11 July 1964 – 13 October 2012), sometimes credited as Sze To Kam Yuen or Szeto Kam Yuen, was a Hongkonger screenwriter.

Career

Szeto began his career with TVB and later with Milkway Image.

He is best known for his action-thrillers including SPL: Sha Po Lang (2005), Exiled (2006)  and Flash Point (2007).

Szeto died of lung cancer in Hong Kong at age 48.

Partial screenwriter filmography

References

External links

1964 births
2012 deaths
Hong Kong screenwriters